Elections to Local bodies in Tamil Nadu were held in two phases in rural areas in the month of December 2019 viz. 27 December 2019 and 30 December 2019 for 27 districts. 

India's top court also holds the election for remaining 9 newly formed districts from the four existing districts. It is also stated that Election Commission should conduct proper frame rule with the reservations for Women and SC/ST for the newly formed districts and shall conduct the elections for remaining 9 districts. Urban Local Body elections (15 municipal corporations, including mayoral posts, 148 municipalities and 561 town panchayats) were also on hold and it will be conducted along with the Rural Local body election held for the 9 newly formed districts. It was initially delayed due to the COVID-19 pandemic.

Election Schedule

Phase 1 covers 156 Panchayat unions and Phase 2 covers 158 Panchayat unions across 27 districts in Tamil Nadu.

Election results

Counting of votes commenced on 02.01.2020 and continued to go on for the next day(03.01.2020). Official results were published on Tamil Nadu State Election Commission website

Corporation Mayor, Chairman of Municipalities and Town panchayat will be elected through in-direct election method.
i.e. The elected Councillors of the local bodies will elect the heads of the urban local bodies among-st themselves after the results.

References

External links
Local body election model 2019
Local body election notification 2019
 Official TN Government Gazette election notification 2019

Elections in Tamil Nadu
2010s in Tamil Nadu
2019 elections in India
Local government in Tamil Nadu
Local elections in Tamil Nadu